The Sports Emmy Award for Outstanding Sports Personality, Studio Host has been awarded since 1993. The award is given to an on-air personality that hosts a pregame or postgame show, or gives news during event coverage, but does not commentate on the event itself. This award is considered to be the most prestigious of all given under the Outstanding Sports Personality category. Before this subcategory was set up, an award was given to either a studio host or an event commentator from 1968 to 1992. See that article for a list of winners (Outstanding Host or Commentator).

List of Winners
Listed below are the winners of the award for each year, as well as the other nominees.
1993: Bob Costas (NBC)
1994: Bob Costas (2) (NBC)
1995: Bob Costas (3) (NBC)
1996: Bob Costas (4) (NBC)
1997: Dan Patrick (ESPN)
1998: James Brown (FOX)
1999: James Brown (2) (FOX)
2000: Bob Costas (5) (NBC)
2001: Bob Costas (6) (HBO) / Ernie Johnson, Jr. (TNT/TBS)
2002: Bob Costas (7) (NBC/HBO)
2003: Bob Costas (8) (NBC/HBO)
2004: Bob Costas (9) (NBC/HBO)
2005: Bob Costas (10) (NBC/HBO)
2006: Ernie Johnson Jr. (2) (TNT)
2007: James Brown (3) (CBS)
2008: Bob Costas (11) (NBC/HBO)
2009: Bob Costas (12) (NBC/MLB Network)
2010: Bob Costas (13) (NBC/MLB Network)
2011: Bob Costas (14) (NBC/MLB Network)
2012: Bob Costas (15) (NBC/NBC Sports Network)
2013: Bob Costas (16) (NBC/MLB Network)
2014: Ernie Johnson Jr. (3) (TNT/TBS) - gave the trophy to the family of the late Stuart Scott
2015: Bob Costas (17) (NBC/MLB Network)
2016: Bob Costas (18) (NBC/MLB Network)
2017: Bob Ley (ESPN)
2018: Ernie Johnson, Jr. (4) (TNT/CBS)
2019: Ernie Johnson, Jr. (5) (TNT/CBS)
2020: Ernie Johnson, Jr. (6) (TNT/CBS)
2021: Mike Tirico (NBC)

Winners and nominees

References

Studio Host